Biotechcellence is a national level technical symposium born from the co-operative efforts of Department of Biotechnology (DBT) and Association of Bio-technologists of Anna University. The symposium aims to highlight the advancements in Biotechnology in the Medical, Industrial, and Agricultural fields that have taken place over the years. It serves as a platform for students to exhibit their ideas, opinions and research ideas. It also provides an opportunity for the participants to interact with prominent personalities associated with Biotechnology and its related fields.

Centre for Biotechnology
The Centre for Biotechnology (CBT) was established in 1987 in Anna University, supported by the Department of Biotechnology, Delhi and the University Grants Commission, Delhi, with the following objectives:
 To provide educational and training facilities in different areas of Biotechnology
 To carry out fundamental research in the frontier areas of Biotechnology and
 To promote research and consultancy activities in the development of various areas of Biotechnology

Centre For Biotechnology was one of the first departments to offer Industrial Biotechnology (IBT) as a professional course, and later began courses in Pharmaceutical Technology and Food Technology as added specializations.

History
Biotechcellence was started in the year 1994 by the Association of Biotechnologists, Anna University. Biotechcellence has hosted many notable people of both science and industry backgrounds. Some notable people to have attended Biotechcellence are James Watson, Jules Hoffmann, and Dr. Madhan Babu, Cambridge University.

Biotechcellence 2017
Biotechcellence 2017, the 23rd edition of Biotechcellence, will be organized on March 9,10,11 of 2017  at Anna University. It consists of the symposium, events and workshops. The symposium serves as a platform for the students to exhibit their talents.

The following events will be held as a part of Biotechcellence 2017:
 Oral Presentation
 Poster Presentation
 Bacteriography
 Pick Your Brains
 Cerebrus
 5+ Online Events

The Workshops which are a part of Biotechcellence 2017 are:
 Stem cell Technology
 Food Adulteration Analysis
 Bio-Informatics

References

Website
 https://web.archive.org/web/20170218065131/https://www.biotechcellence2017.com/
 Hindu article on Biotechcellence 2008
 Hindu article on Biotechcellence 2006

Anna University
Biotechnology organizations
Academic conferences
Biotechnology in India
1994 establishments in Tamil Nadu
Organizations established in 1994